Luciano Finardi (born 15 January 1966) is a Brazilian fencer. He competed in the individual épée event at the 1992 Summer Olympics.

References

External links
 

1966 births
Living people
Brazilian male épée fencers
Olympic fencers of Brazil
Fencers at the 1992 Summer Olympics
20th-century Brazilian people